{{Infobox religious building
| name                  = Athar Jamad Masjid
| native_name           = The Big Mosque
| image                 = Athar Jamaath Masjid2.JPG
| religious_affiliation = Islam
| location              = Oppanakara Street, Coimbatore
| established           = 1904
| tradition             = 
| leadership            = President:janab.  A.Shanawaz MA.,DMLT.,
| architecture_type     = Mosque
| capacity              = 2000
| minaret_quantity      = 4
| minaret_height        = 
| website               = 
}}

Athar Jamad Masjid (also known as The Big Mosque ) is located at Oppanakara Street and at the Town Hall within the Coimbatore district of Tamil Nadu in India. It is one of the oldest and biggest musjid in Coimbatore. 

 History and construction 
A perfume merchant named Athar, who migrated from Tirunelveli, built this structure. It took 44 years to complete; it was begun in 1860 and finished in 1904. The structure is made up of limestone and mortar and polished with egg white. The facade is covered with cusped arches surrounding the open courtyard, where the prayer halls stand. There is a covered ablution pond in the south-eastern corner and a small library on the eastern side. There's also a kitchen that prepares nonbu kanji'' (rice soup), in the fasting period during the Ramzan month. Hawkers line the entrance with their colorful amulets and items of worship.

According to the Indian National Trust for Art and Cultural Heritage (INTACH), the two minars, with domed roofs, on the northern and southern sides, are 85 feet high. This pair of silver domes stands out in the skyline of Town Hall area. In better climes they could well have been the gates of heaven (also called as Jannah). These had crafted with wrought-iron hide behind cluttered cables lining Oppanakara Street. The gates tower up to the stained glass and four minarets above. The mosque has a capacity of accommodating about 2,000 worshippers for the Friday prayers. A Sufi dargah, belonging to a Pir Jamesha Waliullah, is in close proximity to the mosque.

Dargah 
The masjid is built beside the tomb of Jamesha Waliullah, a Waliullah who died in the 1850's. His tomb, which is now a dargah on Big Bazaar Street, is on the southern side of the masjid and is worshipped by non-Muslims and Muslims alike. Jamaat authorities say that they donated Big Bazaar Street to the Corporation, much before independence, as Town Hall area had developed into the city's main business district. The quaint little dargah stands in the middle of the street. Visitors are blessed inside the dargah with amulets tied around their necks to ward off evil spirits.

Following 
The Jamaat comprises the descendants of the 52 families from Tirunelveli that moved to Coimbatore in 1850. According to Jamaat secretary A.R.Baserdeen, there are now 1355 members are alive. The Jamaat's elected executive committee manages the masjid, Jamesha Waliullah dargah on Big Bazaar Street, Jungal Pir dargah on Trichy road of the same city and the Cemetery Masjid beside Coimbatore Junction. The committee also runs three schools in the area with a total strength of 1200 students. What's interesting is the democratic election process of the Jamaat, which has a voter’s lists and even requires signatures of the electors before polling. Court records show that this electoral process dates back to 1920.

Up to 2000 worshippers gather here for Friday prayers. During Ramzan and Bakrid, crowds flock to the masjid and the dargah beside it.

See also 
 List of mosques in India
 Timeline of Islamic history
 Islamic architecture
 Islamic art
 List of mosques

References 

Mosques in Tamil Nadu
Mosques completed in 1904
Coimbatore district